Aghold was a parish in the Half Barony of Shillelagh, in the county of Wicklow; in the Province of Leinster in Ireland. Within its boundaries lies Aghowle Church The Anglican church dates from 1716.

Notes

External links
Tithe appointment books
Parish records
Townlands

Geography of County Wexford